Nong Pla Sawai is a village and tambon (subdistrict) of Ban Hong District, in Lamphun Province, Thailand. In 2005 it had a population of 4081 people. The tambon contains eight villages.

References

Tambon of Lamphun province
Populated places in Lamphun province